Kaplansky's theorem may refer to:
 Kaplansky's theorem on projective modules
 Kaplansky's theorem on quadratic forms
 Kaplansky density theorem